The Centers for International Business Education and Research (CIBERs) are resources for international business education in the United States funded by through the United States Department of Education.

History
The centers were established in 1988 as part of the Omnibus Foreign Trade and Competitiveness Act of 1988 As part of the legislation, CIBERs are mandated to provide six specific services among their services. There are CIBERs at 17 universities in the United States.

CIBERS
Brigham Young University
Florida International University
George Washington University
Georgia Institute of Technology
Georgia State University
Indiana University
Loyola Marymount University
Michigan State University
San Diego State University
Temple University
Texas A&M University
U.S. Department of Education
University of Colorado at Denver
University of Maryland
University of South Carolina
University of Washington

References

External links
Official Website
Start Business Tips
Business Advice & Tips

Foreign trade of the United States
Business education
Business organizations based in the United States